Prince Moritz may refer to:

Prince Moritz of Anhalt-Dessau (1712–1760)
Moritz, Landgrave of Hesse (1926–2013)
Prince Moritz of the Princely Family of Liechtenstein
Prince Moritz of Saxe-Altenburg (1829–1907)

See also
Georg Moritz, Hereditary Prince of Saxe-Altenburg (1900–1991)
Prince Maurice (disambiguation)
Prince Maurits (disambiguation)